Microcaecilia nicefori is a species of caecilian in the family Siphonopidae. It is endemic to Colombia. Its natural habitats are subtropical or tropical moist lowland forests, arable land, pastureland, plantations, rural gardens, heavily degraded former forest, and irrigated land.

References

nicefori
Amphibians of Colombia
Endemic fauna of Colombia
Amphibians described in 1924
Taxonomy articles created by Polbot